Sivasakthi Narayanan (born 9 July 2001) is an Indian professional footballer who plays as a forward for Indian Super League club Bengaluru.

Club career

Youth
Sivasakthi's youth career began when he was picked up by a local team during trials in Karaikudi.
Sivasakthi was scouted by Raman Vijan Soccer School and he was the top scorer in the 2018-19 season of Elite League with 22 goals for the club. He then joined Bengaluru FC's B team, where he played for the club in the 2020-21 season of Bangalore Super Division league. He emerged as the top goal scorer after scoring a staggering 15 goals for the club, which includes two hat-tricks.

Bengaluru FC
On 8 April 2021, Bengaluru FC announced their squad for their AFC Cup campaign, which saw the 20-year-old getting maiden call up for the senior team. He made his senior team debut when he replaced Suresh Singh in the game against Bashundhara Kings at the group stage of 2021 AFC Cup. He scored his first goal for Bengaluru, ten minutes after being substituted against Maziya S&RC.

Personal life
Hailing from a football frenzy district of Karaikudi, Sivasakthi picked up football as an interest and went on to get selected for the trials held in his hometown, when he was in 7th grade at school. When he and his friends began to pick their favourite ISL teams, Sivasakthi chose to be a fan of Bengaluru FC. Sivasakthi lost his father when he was young and is now survived by his mother, who according to Sivasakthi, raised and supported him to follow his passion. During the 2020-21 Bangalore Super Division season, Bengaluru FC B team's Head Coach, Sandesh Bhoite said that Sivasakthi is tall, lanky and has the kind of core strength that gets him past even the heaviest challenges.

Career statistics

Club

Honours

Bengaluru
 Durand Cup: 2022

Individual
 2018–19 Indian Elite League – Top goal scorer
 2020–21 Bangalore Super Division – Top goal scorer and Best forward of the season award
 2022–23 Indian Super League – Emerging player of the league

References

External links 
 
 Siva Narayanan at Indian Super League
 Sivasakthi Narayanan at ESPN

2001 births
Living people
People from Sivaganga district
Indian footballers
Bengaluru FC players
Association football midfielders
Footballers from Tamil Nadu
 Bangalore Super Division players